Matt Abbott (born 13 March 1966) is a Canadian sailor. He competed in the 2000 Summer Olympics. With his older brother Bill Abbott, Jr. as helmsman and fellow crew member Brad Boston they took the 13th place

References

1966 births
Living people
Sailors at the 2000 Summer Olympics – Soling
Canadian male sailors (sport)
Olympic sailors of Canada
Sportspeople from Sarnia